Joseph Patrick Kelly (Joe Kelly) is a scholar, editor, and professor of English at the College of Charleston.  He currently serves as Speaker of the Faculty. He earned his B.A. from the University of Dallas and received his Ph.D. in English in 1992 from the University of Texas, Austin.  Dr. Kelly was born in 1962 and resides in Charleston, South Carolina.

Scholar and Professor
Dr. Kelly is a tenured professor, speaker of the faculty, and past graduate director of the English program at the College of Charleston.  His book Our Joyce: From Outcast to Icon was published in 1998, and he has written critical articles on James Joyce and presented at the American Conference for Irish Studies.  In addition to his interests in modern British fiction, he conducts research in antebellum South Carolina history and recently published “Henry Laurens and the Southern Man of Conscience” in the South Carolina Historical Magazine.  Dr. Kelly is an active member of the faculty senate and also serves as a Western Civilization professor for the Honors Program.

During his undergraduate career, Dr. Kelly was a co-author of the Groundhogiad, an epic poem about drinking beer.

Editor
Dr. Kelly edited the five volume Seagull Reader series for W.W. Norton.  Each volume offers introductory material and anthology reading appropriate for composition and literature classes.  The collection includes Seagull Reader: Essays, Seagull Reader: Poetry, Seagull Reader: Plays, Seagull Reader: Stories, and Seagull Reader: Literature.

External links
https://web.archive.org/web/20070207042515/http://www.cofc.edu/~english/people/kelly.html
https://web.archive.org/web/20070207122639/http://www.wwnorton.com/college/titles/english/seagull2/
http://www.southcarolinahistoricalsociety.org/
https://web.archive.org/web/20110109234435/http://www.acisweb.com/index.php

Living people
College of Charleston alumni
American academics of English literature
University of Texas at Austin College of Liberal Arts alumni
University of Dallas alumni
Year of birth missing (living people)